Tutur Tinular is an Indonesian historical-drama radio series.  Consists of 24 chapters with a total of 720 episodes, it was first aired in January 1989. At its prime, it was aired on 515 radio stations in Indonesia with millions of listeners. It was adapted to movies (Tutur Tinular I, II, III, IV) from 1989-1992. It was then adapted into a TV series  produced by Genta Buana Pitaloka and first aired on ANTV on October 25, 1997.

The 1997 TV series version is considered as one of the best adaptation of the radio series.

Cast 
 Anto Wijaya as Arya Kamandanu 
 Piet Ermas as Arya Dwipangga
 Deivy Zulyanti Nasution as Nari Ratih
 Murti Sari Dewi as Sakawuni
 Lamting as Loe Shih Shan
 Lie Yun Juan as Mei Shin
 Batdorj-in Baasanjab as Kau Hsing 1
 Tian Wei Dong as Kubilai Khan
 Agus Kuncoro as Raden Wijaya (Prabu Kertarajasa Jayawardhana)
 Chairil JM as Mpu Ranubhaya
 Hendra Cipta as Mpu Hanggareksa
 Syaiful Nazar as Mpu Tong Bajil
 Anika Hakim as Dewi Sambi
 Tizar Purbaya as Prabu Kertanagara
 Piet Pagau as Prabu Jayakatwang (season 1) and Mpu Lunggah (season 2)
 Nungki Kusumastuti as Nararya Turukbali
 Hadi Leo as Lembu Sora
 Herbi Latul as Ranggalawe
 Candy Satrio as Patih Nambi
 Rayvaldo Luntungan as Rakai Dukut dan Dyah Halayudha
 Rizal Muhaimin as Ardharaja (season 1) and Ra Tanca (season 2)
 Johan Saimima as Patih Kebo Mundarang
 Irgy Ahmad Fahrezi as Prabu Jayanagara
 Hans Wanaghi as Meng Chi
 Wingky Harun as Ki Tamparowang
 Dian Sitoresmi as Nini Ragarunting
 Lilis Suganda as Ayu Pupuh/Dewi Tunjung Biru (season 1) and Tribhuwaneswari 2 (season 2)
 Teddy Uncle as Pranaraja (season 1) and Mpu Wahana (season 2)
 Rizal Djibran as Ra Kuti
 Febriyanti as Gayatri Rajapatni
 Dhini Aminarti as Tribhuwana Wijayatunggadewi
 Yuni Sulistyawati as Palastri (season 1), Luh Jinggan (season 2), and Sitangsu (season 2)
 Wulan Guritno as Praharsini
 Trixie Fadriane Etheim as Young Ayu Wandira 
 Suzanna Meilia as Sunggi (season 1), Dyah Dara Pethak (season 2), and Ayu Wandira (season 2)
 Benny Burnama as Ki Pamungsu
 Bambang Suryo as Arya Wiraraja
 Rendy Ricky Bramasta as Banyak Kapuk
 Deonardus as Jambunada
 M. Iqbal as Young Panji Ketawang
 Sawung Sembadha as Panji Ketawang
 Rizal Fadli as figuran (season 1), Balunghura (season 1)and Panji Ketawang (season 2)
 Eddy Dhosa as Kuda Prana
 Rifky Alfarez as Gajah Mada
 David Macpal as Dangdi
 Anne J. Cotto as Mertaraga
 Irman F.R. Heryana as Lanang Dhanapala
 Aspar Paturusi as Rekyan Wuru
 S. Manan Dipa as Ramapati (season 1), Mpu Sasi (season 2), and Rakai Pamitihan (season 2)
 Fitria Anwar as Kurantil
 Tien Kadaryono as Nyi Pamiji
 Alex Bernard as Kebo Kluyur (season 1) and Wong Yin (season 2)
 Andre Yega as Adirasa (season 1) and Jarawaha (season 2)
 Nani Somanegara as Nyi Rongkot
 Antoni Sumadi as Ki Sugatabrahma
 Rochim Lahatu as Kebo Anabrang (season 1 dan 2) and Jabung Tarewes (season 2)
 Tanase as Gajah Pagon (season 1) 
 Zainal Pattikawa as Jaran Lejong (season 1) and Ra Wedeng (season 2)
 Norman Syam as Jarawaha (season 1), Gajah Biru (season 1 dan 2), and Ra Yuyu 2 (season 2)
 Garnis Pangandaran as Langkir (season 1), dan Trisura (season 2)
 Steven Sakari as Wong Chau
 Ricky Husada as Chan Pie
 Land Sudirman Piyana as Linggapati
 Abhie Cancer as Kau Hsing 2
 Lilis Puspitasari as Werdamurti (season 1) and Jangir (season 2)
 Prie Panggie as Ra Kawi (season 1), and Walikadep (season 2)
 Krisno Bossa as Ki Bokor
 Uliasari as Retno Palupi
 Syamsul Gondo as Wirot
 Aldona Toncic as Tabib

Synopsis 
The story began when Kamandanu, a blacksmith's second son, was interested to an old sage, Ranubhaya who was an expert in martial arts. He started to study martial arts from Ranubhaya and learned that Ranubhaya was actually his father's schoolmate in weaponry. While Kamandanu's father chose to be a weapon supplier to government—at the time: Kingdom Singhasari, Ranubhaya chose to not cooperate with the government and isolate himself.

When the father learn the teacher-student relationship between his second son and Ranubhaya, he became angry and accused Ranubhaya as traitor and used the government army to attack Ranubhaya's shrine. The relationship between Kamandanu and his father became worse and Kamandanu wanderer as a warrior.

The story became more complex when Ranubhaya, which had survived from his house destruction, was kidnapped by Kubilai Khan's envoy who were amazed by his expertise in weaponry. Being a prisoner in China, he was forced to make a great sword, Nagapuspa (naga means dragon). Finishing the sword, he was murdered by the official who was afraid if Ranubhaya created another sword for rival of Nagapuspa. Before his death, he asked a warrior couple, Lo Si Shan and Mei Ling, to bring the sword to Che Po (Java Island, pronounced in old-china language) and give it to Kamandanu.

The story was continued by the involvement of Kamandanu in Raden Wijaya's troop, survivors of Singhasari kingdom after being attack by Kediri kingdom. The involvement repair the relationship between Kamandanu and his father, especially after his brother, Dwipangga betrayed them. Kamandanu helped Raden Wijaya create his own kingdom, Majapahit.

Tutur Tinular was started in Kertanegara's era (last king of Singhasari) and ended in Jayanegara's era (second king of Majapahit). It began when the main character was still young and ended when the main character had already old. It shows the development from an idealist young lad to a sage who didn't want to see the war again and isolated himself.

The development of other characters were also interesting. Dwipangga for example, began his life in this story as a physically weak poet. Then, he tried to changed his life by betrayed his family for golds of Kediri. After being beaten and humiliated by his own brother in front of his wife and his son, he studied martial-art and became a scary warrior, called as Penyair Berdarah (Bleeding Poet). After beaten by Kamandanu for the second time, he disappeared and forgotten until his daughter found him as a pitiful helpless blind old man.

Awards

References

External links 

 

Indonesian television soap operas
1997 Indonesian television series debuts
1999 Indonesian television series endings
ANTV original programming